A Wet Handle is an album by Ivor Cutler, originally released in 1997 on Creation Records.

Track listing
(all by Cutler)
"Her Tissues" 	(1:20)
"An American Drink" (0:29)
"One Day" (0:32)
"Out of Decency" (0:30)
"My Disposition" (1:10)
"No I Won't" (0:49)
"It's Stupid" (0:36)
"By the Bush" 	(1:04)
"The Thatcher Generation" (0:58)
"My Vest" (0:31)
"Goosie" (1:03)
"When It Wants" (0:44)
"Her Zimmer" (0:24)
"The Farmer's Wife" (0:26)
"Bets" (0:55)
"Just in Time" (1:09)
"The Specific Sundry" (1:50)
"Just Listen" (0:38)
"The Breaking Point" (0:38)
"Spring Back" 	(0:35)
"Hell" (0:25)
"A Man" (0:14)
"The Place" (0:37)
"Hello Explorer!" (0:38)
"Not Asking" (0:40)
"His Slow Hand" (0:32)
"Local Creatures" (1:00)
"Heptagon" (0:37)
"Where's My Razor?" (0:54)
"One Side" (0:33)
"Singing to My Foot" (0:35)
"Ride Off" (0:26)
"A Great Albatross" (0:33)
"A Berd" (0:26)
"Half and Half" (0:40)
"Get off the Road" (0:42)
"A Fine Example" (0:32)
"Faces of People" (0:29)
"Stand Well Clear" (0:44
"Naughty Sydney" (0:50)
"Perverse" (0:51)
"The Bargain" (0:43)
"Space Sandwich" (0:44)
"Baked Beetles" (1:07)
"Taking Hands" (0:34)
"Entities" (0:52)
"It" (0:20)
"A Kitchen Knife" (0:44)
"Not from Hens" (0:43)
"The Carpet" (0:27)
"Beyond" (0:36)
"The Way Out" (0:27)
"To Take" (0:15)
"Do You Call That Living?" (0:29)
"On Holiday" (0:26)
"The Taste of Gunny" (0:34)
"A Blunt Yashmak" (0:42)
"The Kiddies" 	(0:29)
"I Give Up" (0:56)
"My Window Box" (1:08)
"A Pain in the Neck" 	(1:47)
"Not Even" (0:16)
"Tablets" (1:00)
"Flat Thin Chests" (0:43)
"A Good Girl" 	(0:41)
"He Himself" 	(0:57)
"Uncrossing Her Legs" 	(0:47)
"Crete/Greece" (0:31)
"Squeaky" (0:46)
"Oddly Comforting" (1:06)
"An Original Sweet" (0:31)
"The Bridge" 	(1:00)
"Butterfly" (0:50)
"Snaps" (0:18)
"Just" (0:23)
"Hummed and Hawed" (0:56)
"Thursday" (0:25)
"A Cosy Nest" 	:22
"A Slice of Seedcake" 	(0:47)
"What a Funny Room" 	(0:37)
"Heavy Rock" 	(0:34)
"The Whole Forest" (0:41)
"Little Hetty" (0:23)

References

Ivor Cutler albums
1997 albums
Creation Records albums